The greater wagtail-tyrant (Stigmatura budytoides) is a South American species of bird in the family Tyrannidae. A small bird, but larger than the related lesser wagtail-tyrant. The greater wagtail-tyrant occurs in two distinct populations: One in woodland and shrub in southeastern Bolivia, western Paraguay, and central and northwestern Argentina, and a second in the Caatinga region in northeastern Brazil. The latter is sometimes considered a separate species, the Caatinga wagtail-tyrant (S. gracilis).

References

greater wagtail-tyrant
Birds of the Caatinga
Birds of the Gran Chaco
greater wagtail-tyrant
Taxonomy articles created by Polbot